Sara Lynn Anundsen (born June 21, 1985) is an American former professional tennis player.

Born in Denver, Anundsen attended Columbine High School and was a three-time Colorado state schools champion from 2001 to 2003, going undefeated (50–0).

Anundsen played collegiate tennis for the University of North Carolina and won the 2007 NCAA doubles championship partnering Jenna Long, which was the first national title for the Tar Heels. This earned the pair a wildcard into the doubles main draw of the 2007 US Open.

References

External links
 
 

1985 births
Living people
American female tennis players
North Carolina Tar Heels women's tennis players
Tennis people from Colorado
Sportspeople from Denver